"Ma vie" is the first single by French R&B singer Amine, released in 2005 from his album Au delà des rêves.

Track listing
CD single
"Ma vie" (French version) - Avant-première
"Ma vie" (French and Arabic version)
"Ma vie" (Arabic version)
"Ma vie" (Video)

Charts

External links
"Ma vie" music video

References

2005 singles
Amine (singer) songs
Songs written by Skalp
Songs written by Leslie (singer)
Songs written by Kore (producer)